Pool Sharks (also sometimes known as The Pool Shark) is a 1915 silent short film. The film is notable for being the film acting and writing debut of W. C. Fields and also features early instances of stop-motion animation during a game of pool.

Plot summary
Following a standard style of the era, the film is a romantic slapstick comedy short. Fields and his rival (played by Bud Ross) vie over the affections of a woman (played by Marian West). When their antics get out of hand at a picnic, it is decided that they should play a game of pool. Both of them are pool sharks, and after the game turns into a farce, a fight ensues. Fields throws a ball at his rival, who ducks. The ball flies through the window and breaks a hanging goldfish bowl, soaking the woman they are fighting over and leaving goldfish in her hair. She storms into the pool hall and rejects both men.

Production

Casting
Fields helped make this film in New York City, taking time off from the Ziegfeld Follies, as publicity for the film pointed out. Vaudeville was Fields' primary vocation, and it would be nine years before he made his next known film, 1924's Janice Meredith.

Fields wore his obviously fake moustache in this film, as he did in all of his silent films. His character and mannerisms bear some resemblance to Charlie Chaplin's, although the persona Fields later developed in his sound comedies is foreshadowed during the picnic scene, when Fields's character dumps a small child out of a chair so that he can steal it to get closer to the woman he is chasing.

Animation

Fields was an expert juggler. As with his early films, Pool Sharks was intended to highlight a pool ball juggling act that featured in the actor's vaudeville show. In the final film, however, there is only a brief shot of Fields juggling several billiard balls, as his act was largely replaced with several poorly edited stop motion sequences depicting impossible shots, such as the balls jumping off the table and re-racking themselves on the wall. Though innovative for the time, they are poorly animated, with obvious edits, and the animator's hand can actually be seen moving the balls along in one of the frames.

Reaction
Today, Pool Sharks is best remembered as Fields' first film effort. Film historian William K. Everson critiques the film as an "auspicious debut", with Fields' routines and pacing already finely honed. It was one of two short films Fields made for a company called Gaumont, distributed by Mutual. He and Ross made another short around the same time, His Lordship's Dilemma.

References
The Films of W.C. Fields, by Donald Deschner, The Citadel Press, New York, 1966.
The Art of W.C. Fields, by William K. Everson, Bonanza Books, New York, 1967.

External links 

 
 
 
 Pool Sharks on YouTube
 Pool Sharks, with soundtrack on YouTube

1915 films
American silent short films
American black-and-white films
1910s romantic comedy films
1910s sports comedy films
Cue sports films
American films with live action and animation
1910s stop-motion animated films
Films directed by Edwin Middleton
Films with screenplays by W. C. Fields
American sports comedy films
1915 animated films
1915 short films
1915 comedy films
Articles containing video clips
Films shot in New York City
1910s American films
Silent American comedy films
Silent sports comedy films